The Dariv Formation is a Late Jurassic geologic formation in Govi-Altay, Mongolia. Dinosaur remains diagnostic to the genus level are among the fossils that have been recovered from the mudstones and sandstones of the formation.

Fossil content 
 Mamenchisaurus sp. (sauropod indet)

See also 
 List of dinosaur-bearing rock formations
 List of stratigraphic units with few dinosaur genera

References

Bibliography

Further reading 
 S. A. Graham, M. S. Hendrix, R. Barsbold, D. Badamgarav, D. Sjostrom, W. Kirschner, and J. S. McIntosh. 1997. Stratigraphic occurrence, paleoenvironment, and description of the oldest known dinosaur (Late Jurassic) from Mongolia. Palaios 12:292-297
 M. Watabe, K. Tsogtbaatar, L. Uranbileg and L. Gereltsetseg. 2004. Report on the Japan-Mongolia Joint Paleontological Expedition to the Gobi desert, 2002. Hayashibara Museum of Natural Sciences Research Bulletin 2:97-122
 M. Watabe, K. Tsogtbaatar, T. Tsuihiji and R. Barsbold. 2003. The first discovery of diverse Jurassic dinosaur faunas in Mongolia. Journal of Vertebrate Paleontology 23(3, suppl.):108A

Geologic formations of Mongolia
Jurassic System of Asia
Jurassic Mongolia
Mudstone formations
Sandstone formations
Fluvial deposits
Paleontology in Mongolia
Formations